Ereminellus is a genus of dirt-colored seed bugs in the family Rhyparochromidae. There are at least two described species in Ereminellus.

Species
These two species belong to the genus Ereminellus:
 Ereminellus arizonensis (Barber, 1932)
 Ereminellus vitabundus Brailovsky & Barrera, 1984

References

Rhyparochromidae
Articles created by Qbugbot